Chionothremma is a genus of moths belonging to the subfamily Tortricinae of the family Tortricidae. The genus was erected by Alexey Diakonoff in 1952.

Species

Chionothremma auriflua Diakonoff, 1952
Chionothremma auripes Diakonoff, 1952
Chionothremma caelestis Diakonoff, 1952
Chionothremma capnoptera (Diakonoff, 1944)
Chionothremma carbonifera Diakonoff, 1952
Chionothremma citricaput Diakonoff, 1952
Chionothremma combusta Diakonoff, 1952
Chionothremma euxantha Diakonoff, 1952
Chionothremma ferratilis Diakonoff, 1952
Chionothremma gracilis Diakonoff, 1952
Chionothremma marginata Diakonoff, 1952
Chionothremma martyranthes (Meyrick, 1938)
Chionothremma melanoleuca (Diakonoff, 1944)
Chionothremma mesoxantha Diakonoff, 1952
Chionothremma mutans Diakonoff, 1952
Chionothremma nebulicola Diakonoff, 1952
Chionothremma nigrangula Diakonoff, 1952
Chionothremma niphadea Diakonoff, 1952
Chionothremma nivisperennis Diakonoff, 1952
Chionothremma obscura Diakonoff, 1952
Chionothremma ocellata Diakonoff, 1952
Chionothremma ochricauda Diakonoff, 1952
Chionothremma pallescens Diakonoff, 1952
Chionothremma placida Diakonoff, 1952
Chionothremma plicata (Diakonoff, 1941)
Chionothremma pythia (Meyrick, 1920)
Chionothremma sanguens Diakonoff, 1952
Chionothremma soligena Diakonoff, 1952
Chionothremma spectabilis (Diakonoff, 1944)

See also
List of Tortricidae genera

References

 Diakonoff, A. (1952). Verhandelingen der Koninklijke Nederlandse Akademie van Wetenschappen. (2) 49 (1): 51.
 Brown, John W. (2005). World Catalogue of Insects. 5.

External links
Tortricid.net

Chionothremma
Tortricidae genera
Taxa named by Alexey Diakonoff